The Heinkel He 59 was a twin-engined German biplane designed in 1930, resulting from a requirement for a torpedo bomber and reconnaissance aircraft able to operate on wheeled landing gear or twin-floats.

Development

In 1930, Ernst Heinkel began developing an aircraft for the Reichsmarine. To conceal the true military intentions, the aircraft was officially a civil aircraft. The He 59B landplane prototype was the first to fly, an event that took place in September 1931, but it was the He 59A floatplane prototype that paved the way for the He 59B initial production model, of which 142 were delivered in three variants. The Heinkel He 59 was a pleasant aircraft to fly; deficiencies noted were the weak engine, the limited range, the small load capability and insufficient armament.

Design
The aircraft was of a mixed-material construction. The wings were made of a two-beam wooden frame, where the front was covered with plywood and the rest of the wing was covered with fabric. The box-shaped fuselage had a fabric-covered steel frame. The tail section was covered with lightweight metal sheets.

The keels of the floats were used as fuel tanks - each one holding  of fuel. The propeller was fixed-pitch with four blades.

Operations
During the first months of World War II, the He 59 was used as a torpedo- and minelaying aircraft. Between 1940 and 1941 the aircraft was used as a reconnaissance aircraft, and in 1941-42 as a transport, air-sea rescue, and training aircraft. Some had been operated by the Condor Legion in Spain during the Spanish Civil War in 1936 as coastal reconnaissance and torpedo floatplanes.

The British claimed that because the air-sea rescue aircraft were being used for reconnaissance, they were legitimate targets despite carrying Red Cross markings. Even before then some had been forced down by British aircraft.

The Ilmavoimat (Finnish Air Force) rented four aircraft from Germany in August 1943. These were used to ferry long-range reconnaissance patrols behind enemy lines. They were returned to Germany four months later.

Operators

Finnish Air Force

Luftwaffe

Spanish Air Force

Variants
He 59a : first prototype.
He 59b : second prototype.
He 59A : test and evaluation aircraft. 14 built.
He 59B-1 : 16 pre-production aircraft.
He 59B-2 : improved version.
He 59B-3 : reconnaissance aircraft.
He 59C-1 : unarmed trainer
He 59C-2 : air-sea rescue model
He 59D-1 : combined trainer and air-sea rescue model
He 59E-1 : torpedo bomber trainer
He 59E-2 : reconnaissance trainer
He 59N : navigation trainer produced as He 59D-1 conversions

Specifications (He 59B-2)

See also
Action in the North Atlantic US 1943 war film, includes an episode in which two He 59s attack a freighter

References

Notes

Bibliography
Green, William. War Planes of the Second World War: Volume Six: Floatplanes. London: Macdonald, 1962.
Green, William. Warplanes of the Third Reich. New York: Doubleday, 1972. .
Kalevi Keskinen, Kari Stenman, Klaus Niska: Meritoimintakoneet - Suomen ilmavoimien historia 15, Apali Oy, Tampere 1995,

External links

Brandenburg Historica, The Luftwaffe Seenotdienst (Air Sea Rescue Service) of World War II

Heinkel He 059
Heinkel He 059
Heinkel He 059
Floatplanes
Biplanes
He 059
Aircraft first flown in 1931
Twin piston-engined tractor aircraft
World War II aircraft of Finland